The Venezuelan flycatcher (Myiarchus venezuelensis) is a passerine bird in the tyrant flycatcher family. It was formerly considered to be a race of the short-crested flycatcher, Myiarchus ferox, but the two species overlap without interbreeding in Venezuela, and the calls are different.

It breeds in forest and deciduous woodland in northeastern Colombia, northern Venezuela and Tobago. The nest is built in a tree cavity.

Adult Venezuelan flycatchers are 19 cm long and weigh 24.4g. The upperparts are brown, with the head and short crest darker than the back. The breast is grey and the belly is yellow. The brown tail feathers and wings have narrow rufous outer webs. Sexes are similar, but young birds have broader rufous edgings.

This species is best separated from other confusingly similar Myiarchus species by its call, a whistled wheeerrrr.

The Venezuelan flycatcher is insectivorous and catches its prey amongst the higher branches of trees.

References 

Venezuelan flycatcher
Birds of Venezuela
Venezuelan flycatcher
Venezuelan flycatcher